The J/80 is an American trailerable sailboat that was designed by Rod Johnstone as a one design racer and first built in 1992.

The design is a recognized International Sailing Federation world class with a crew of three sailors.

Production
The design has been built by Tillotson Pearson since 1992, for J/Boats in the United States, with over 1,600 built and it remains in production. At one time it was produced by Waterline Systems, also located in the US.

Design

The J/80 is a racing keelboat, with the hull built predominantly of fiberglass. It has a fractional sloop rig with a  retractable bowsprit controlled from the cockpit by a deployment line. The hull has a raked stem, a plumb transom, a transom-hung rudder controlled by a tiller and a fixed swept fin keel. It displaces  and carries  of ballast.

It can be ground transported on a double axle boat trailer towed by an eight cylinder SUV or van.

It will plane under spinnaker.

Operational history
The boat is supported by an active class club that organizes racing events, the International J/80 Class Association. There are 30 fleets racing in 12 countries, including in North America, Europe and China. It has also been used for two-boat match racing.

In a 1994 expert review in Sailing World Magazine Doug Logan concluded, "In the test's light airs, the J/80 could often sail at or close to windspeed, and in several instances recorded the best leg times. While hard to define as a "conservative" boat, this Rod Johnstone creation doesn't go to the max in sailplan and (lack of) stability, and employs the proven construction materials used in thousands of earlier J/Boats. This might cost a bit of speed in light air with chop, but should broaden the boat's user-friendliness in stronger winds."

Events

See also
List of sailing boat types

References

External links

J/80
Keelboats
1990s sailboat type designs
Sailing yachts
Trailer sailers
One-design sailing classes

Sailboat type designs by Rod Johnstone
Sailboat types built by J/Boats
Sailboat types built by Pearson Yachts
Sailboat types built by Waterline Systems